Callum Anthony Gribbin (born 18 December 1998) is an English professional footballer who plays for F.C. United of Manchester.

Gribbin began his career in the academy of Manchester United, joining in 2008 and spending 11 years with the club before being released. He signed for Sheffield United, and spent a year at the club without making any appearances. He joined Barrow in 2020 for their first campaign in the English Football League in 50 years, where he made his professional debut. After one season, he left Barrow and eventually signed for non-league Radcliffe.

Internationally, he has represented England's U16 and U17 teams, earning 10 caps between 2013 and 2015.

Club career
Having joined Manchester United's academy from a young age, Gribbin plays  for the under 18's and received praise by various newspapers. in the 2014/15 season scoring a free kick, which led to him being compared to Ryan Giggs. In the final game of that season Gribbin made his under 21's debut against Manchester City when he was 16 years old. During that season Gribbin was scouted by Liverpool and Manchester City. Gribbin signed a new four year deal with the club in the summer of 2015. This is a one year scholarship with a three year professional contract. In the 2015–16 season Gribbin made his Under 19 debut in the UEFA Youth League and was praised for his performance against VfL Wolfsburg with Nicky Butt describing him as having a "light bulb moment". 

At the end of his Manchester United contract Gribbin signed for Sheffield United in 2019 and featured for their Under 23 team. Gribbin left the club the following summer.

He moved to Barrow in August 2020. Gribbin made only one league appearance in an injury plagued season before departing in June 2021.

In November 2021, Gribbin signed for Northern Premier League Premier Division team Radcliffe.

In August 2022, he transferred to divisional rivals FC United of Manchester.

International career
Gribbin has represented England at under-16 and under-17 levels.

Career statistics

References

1998 births
Living people
Association football midfielders
Footballers from Salford
English footballers
Manchester United F.C. players
Barrow A.F.C. players
Radcliffe F.C.  players
F.C. United of Manchester players
English Football League players
Northern Premier League players